Ingeleben is a village and former municipality in the district of Helmstedt, in Lower Saxony, Germany. Since 1 November 2016 it has been part of the municipality of Söllingen.

References

Helmstedt (district)
Former municipalities in Lower Saxony